PKN Vidhyasala is an Educational Trust which consists of 9 educational institutions including 2 higher secondary schools, 3 Matriculation schools, 2 Primary schools, 1 CBSE school and an Arts and Science College in the suburbs of Tirumangalam, Madurai, Tamil Nadu, India.

History
The PKN [ Pandiyakula Kshathriya Nadar ] Vidhyasala Committee was started under the leadership of members in Thirumangalam Pandiyakula Kshathriya Nadar Uravinmurai during the year 1909 in Thirumangalam, Madurai district. Now it was developed with 8 schools and an Arts & Science College. In the academic year of 2009–2010, PKN Vidhyasala celebrates its 100th year centenary. In the part of celebration, A. P. J. Abdul Kalam opened the Science Exhibition and make interactive with the Students.

Overview
PKN VIdhyasala Committee(PKNVC) is located under the roof of PKN Boys Higher Secondary School in rural setting of Madurai District and is catering to the needs of the downtrodden and rural children. The founding philosophy of the institute is to lead the people in right path.

Institutions

 PKN Primary & Nursery [North] School
 PKN Primary & Nursery [South] School
 PKN Vidyalaya [CBSE] up to XII (SENIOR SECONDARY SCHOOL)
 PKN Matriculation Higher Secondary School
 PKN Girls Higher Secondary School
PKN Higher Secondary School
 PKN Matriculation School, Pasumalai, Madurai
 PKN Matriculation Higher Secondary School, Dindigul
 PKN Arts and Science College

Alumni
 K. T. K. Thangamani
 P. Kakkan
 G. Nagarajan [Novelist]
 Periyanayagi [Writer]
 N. S. V. Chitthan
 P. V. Parthasarathy Athlete
 V. K. Subbaraj IAS
 V. K. Jayakodi IAS
 Dr.T.Sekar IFS
 Madurai Muthu [Stand-up Comedian]
 Velraj (Cinematographer & Director)
 PKN 1972 SSLC Batch Students are greatest one.
We are Proud to say we undergone studies in the period of HM Mr. Arunachalam.

References

Schools in Tamil Nadu
Education in Madurai district